Nakhon Si United Football Club (Thai: สโมสรฟุตบอล นครศรี ยูไนเต็ด) is a Thai professional football club based in Nakhon Si Thammarat province. Founded in 2014 as named Rajapruk Muangnont United Football Club, the club is currently playing in the Thai League 2.

History

Early years
The club was founded in 2014 under the name Ratchaphruek Muangnont United Football Club located in Pak Kret, Nonthaburi. They used Potinimitwittayakom school's stadium to be their ground. Then, during 2014 season, they relocated to Thanyaburi, Pathum Thani and used Queen Sirikit 60th Anniversary Stadium to be their ground. After that, in 2015, season they relocated to Phutthamonthon, Nakhon Pathom and used Rajamangala University of Technology Rattanakosin Salaya campus's stadium to be their ground.

2016, Renaming
In 2016, the club's boards have renamed this club to Rajapruk University Football Club. Then, relocated to Nong Khaem, Bangkok and used Thonburi University Stadium to be their ground.

2017, Takeover and merger with Nakhon Si Heritage football club
In 2017, this club has taken over by Nakhon Si Heritage's boards and merged it with Nakhon Si Heritage a football club that played in 2016 Regional League Division 2 Southern region. Then, renamed it to Nakhon Si Thammarat Unity Football Club and relocated to Ron Phibun, Nakhon Si Thammarat. They used Nakhon Si Thammarat PAO Stadium to be their ground.

2018, Takeover and merger with Muangkhon United football club
In 2018, this club has taken over by Muangkhon United's boards and merged it with Muangkhon United a football club that played in 2017 Thailand Amateur League Southern region. Then, renamed it to WU Nakhon Si United Football Club and relocated to Tha Sala, Nakhon Si Thammarat. They used Walailak University Stadium to be their ground.

2019, End of contract with Walailak University
In 2019, this club has end of contract with Walailak University and renamed to Nakhon Si United. For this reason, they have removed the text WU out from their logo in this season.

Logo

Honours
Khǒr Royal Cup (ถ้วย ข.)
Runner-up : 2013

Stadium and locations

Season by season record

P = Played
W = Games won
D = Games drawn
L = Games lost
F = Goals for
A = Goals against
Pts = Points
Pos = Final position

QR1 = First Qualifying Round
QR2 = Second Qualifying Round
R1 = Round 1
R2 = Round 2
R3 = Round 3
R4 = Round 4

R5 = Round 5
R6 = Round 6
QF = Quarter-finals
SF = Semi-finals
RU = Runners-up
W = Winners

Players

Current squad

Coaching Staff

Coaches

Youth Team

U19 Team

References

External links
 Rajapruk Muangnont United Official Fanpage
 Nakhon Si Thammarat Unity Official Fanpage
 WU Nakhon Si United Official Fanpage
 WU Muangkhon United Official Website
 WU Nakhon Si United Official Website

Association football clubs established in 2014
Football clubs in Thailand
Nakhon Si Thammarat province
2014 establishments in Thailand
Nakhon Si United F.C.